Gatchellville is an unincorporated community in York County, Pennsylvania, United States.

Maize Quest is the Largest Collection of People-sized Mazes in the World started by Hugh McPherson in 1997.

References

Unincorporated communities in York County, Pennsylvania
Unincorporated communities in Pennsylvania